Aculepeira armida is an orb-weaver spider species (family Araneidae) with a wide distribution in North Africa, Southern Europe, Western Asia, Russia (from Europe to the Far East), and Central Asia to China.

See also 
 List of Araneidae species: A

References

External links 

Araneus
Spiders of Asia
Spiders of Europe
Spiders described in 1826